The base of skull, also known as the cranial base or the cranial floor, is the most inferior area of the skull. It is composed of the endocranium and the lower parts of the calvaria.

Structure

Structures found at the base of the skull are for example:

Bones
There are five bones that make up the base of the skull:
Ethmoid bone
Sphenoid bone
Occipital bone
Frontal bone
Temporal bone

Sinuses
Occipital sinus
Superior sagittal sinus
Superior petrosal sinus

Foramina of the skull
Foramen cecum
Optic foramen
Foramen lacerum
Foramen rotundum
Foramen magnum
Foramen ovale
Jugular foramen
Internal auditory meatus
Mastoid foramen
Sphenoidal emissary foramen
Foramen spinosum

Sutures
Frontoethmoidal suture
Sphenofrontal suture
Sphenopetrosal suture
Sphenoethmoidal suture
Petrosquamous suture
Sphenosquamosal suture

Other

Sphenoidal lingula
Subarcuate fossa
Dorsum sellae
Jugular process
Petro-occipital fissure
Condylar canal
Jugular tubercle
Tuberculum sellae
Carotid groove
Fossa hypophyseos
Posterior clinoid processes
Sigmoid sulcus
Internal occipital protuberance 
Internal occipital crest
Ethmoidal spine
Vestibular aqueduct
Chiasmatic groove
Middle clinoid process
Groove for sigmoid sinus
Trigeminal ganglion
Middle cranial fossa
Anterior cranial fossa
Middle meningeal artery
Cribriform plate
Posterior cranial fossa
Nasociliary nerve
Hypoglossal canal

Additional images

Skull